Karl Fuchs (MdB)  (September 11, 1920 – March 31, 1989) was a German politician, representative of the Christian Social Union of Bavaria.

He was a member of the Landtag of Bavaria from 1966 to 1969.

There is a street in Rochester, NY named after Karl Fuchs.

Christian Social Union in Bavaria politicians
1920 births
1989 deaths
Knights Commander of the Order of Merit of the Federal Republic of Germany